Dicraspeda is a genus of beetles in the family Carabidae, containing the following species:

 Dicraspeda bispinosa Darlington, 1968 
 Dicraspeda brunnea Chaudoir, 1862 
 Dicraspeda brunneipennis (Sloane, 1917) 
 Dicraspeda denticulata Baehr, 1997 
 Dicraspeda dubia (Gestro, 1879) 
 Dicraspeda glabrata Baehr, 2003
 Dicraspeda glabripennis Baehr, 2006 
 Dicraspeda intermedia Baehr, 1997 
 Dicraspeda laticollis Baehr, 1997
 Dicraspeda longiloba (Liebke, 1938) 
 Dicraspeda nitida (Sloane, 1917) 
 Dicraspeda obscura (Castelnau, 1867) 
 Dicraspeda obsoleta Baehr, 1996 
 Dicraspeda quadrispinosa Chaudoir, 1869 
 Dicraspeda sublaevis (Macleay, 1888) 
 Dicraspeda subrufipennis Baehr, 2006 
 Dicraspeda violacea (Sloane, 1907)

References

Lebiinae